Jeremiah is an unincorporated community located in Letcher County, Kentucky, United States.

Climate
The climate in this area is characterized by relatively high temperatures and evenly distributed precipitation throughout the year.  The Köppen Climate System describes the weather as humid subtropical, and uses the abbreviation Cfa.

References

Unincorporated communities in Letcher County, Kentucky
Unincorporated communities in Kentucky